2-Hydroxy-5-methoxybenzaldehyde is an organic compound and an isomer of vanillin.

Synthesis and reactions

The chemical is produced by the Reimer-Tiemann reaction on 4-methoxyphenol with a 79% yield.

It reacts with malononitrile to form 2-imino-6-methoxy-2H-1-benzopyran-3-carbonitrile. It can be reduced by sodium borohydride in ethanol to form 2-hydroxy-5-methoxybenzyl alcohol.

See also
 Vanillin
 Isovanillin
 ortho-Vanillin
 2-Hydroxy-4-methoxybenzaldehyde

References

Phenol ethers
Hydroxybenzaldehydes